Daniel Mannix Petrie Jr. (born November 30, 1951) is a Canadian-American producer, writer, and director of film and television. He is best known for pioneering the sub-genres of action comedy and buddy cop films through films like Beverly Hills Cop and Turner & Hooch. He served as President of the Writers Guild of America, West between 1997 and 1999, and then again between 2004 and 2005.

Life and career 
Petrie was born in Canada to Daniel Petrie Sr., a film director, and Dorothea, a producer, novelist, and actress. He attended Northfield Mount Hermon School and the University of Redlands, earning degrees in psychology and creative writing. Originally a literary agent, he followed in his father's footsteps and joined the film industry as a screenwriter. His debut screenplay, Beverly Hills Cop, was the result of numerous rewrites and several radically different iterations over the course of a decade. At one point, the film was a serious action film starring Sylvester Stallone, a project that Stallone later took with him and developed into Cobra. Despite the troubled production history, the film was a massive critical and financial success, grossing over $300 million  worldwide from a $15 million budget and earning rave reviews from critics like Janet Maslin and Richard Schickel. In spite of much of the film's comedy having been improvised by the actors, Petrie's contributions earned him accolades in the form of Academy Award and Edgar Award nominations.

Petrie wrote a number of well-known and well-received films throughout the 1980s and 1990s, including the off-beat crime thriller The Big Easy starring Dennis Quaid and Ellen Barkin. He wrote two films for director Roger Spottiswoode, the 1988 thriller film Shoot to Kill and the Tom Hanks comedy Turner & Hooch, and produced a third; The 6th Day. Much of his work falls under the umbrella of crime fiction. He made his directorial debut with Toy Soldiers, a 1991 action film revolving around a group of teenagers fighting terrorists that have taken over their prep school. He served as the creator and executive producer of Combat Hospital, a television war drama series produced in his native Canada.

In addition to his creative pursuits, Petrie has been active in various entertainment industry organizations. He served as Vice President, and later President, of the Writers Guild of America, West, and currently sits on its Board of Trustees. He also served as a member of the Board of Trustees for the American Film Institute; a member of the Board of Governors for the Academy of Motion Picture Arts and Sciences; and as a member of the Board of Advisers of the Austin Film Festival and Screenwriting Conference. He is co-founder of Enderby Entertainment, an independent film finance and production company.

Filmography

Film 

Also credited as "Characters" in Beverly Hills Cop sequels.

Television

Personal life 
Petrie's father Daniel Petrie was also a film director, and his brother Donald is an actor and director. His family was awarded an AFI Lifetime Achievement Award in 2001. He currently resides in Los Angeles, California, and holds dual US-Canadian citizenship. He is a member of the Writers Guild of America, Directors Guild of America, SAG-AFTRA, Writers Guild of Canada, Academy of Canadian Cinema & Television, and the Academy of Motion Picture Arts and Sciences.

Awards and nominations 
1984 Academy Award for Best Original Screenplay: Beverly Hills Cop (nomination) - with Danilo Bach

1984 Edgar Award for Best Motion Picture: Beverly Hills Cop (nomination)

1988 Edgar Award for Best Motion Picture: Shoot to Kill (nomination)

2008 Humanitas Prize in 90 Minute Category: Pictures of Hollis Woods (nomination) - with Ann Peacock and Camille Thomasson

2013 WGA Morgan Cox Award (won)

References

External links
 
 Interview with Daniel Petrie Jr by Paul Rowlands about The Big Easy

1951 births
Living people
American film directors
American film producers
American male screenwriters
American people of Canadian descent
University of Redlands alumni
Northfield Mount Hermon School alumni